Dinumma placens is a moth of the family Erebidae first described by Francis Walker in 1858. It is found in the Indian sub-region, Sri Lanka, Thailand, China, Taiwan and Japan.

Forewings darker with some indigo shine. Postmedial is more distant. Zigzag antemedial and postmedial fasciae. A conspicuous dark discal mark found in the medial area between fasciae. Caterpillars are known to feed on Pithecollobium lucidum.

Images

References

Moths of Asia
Moths described in 1858